Eurojet may refer to:

 Eurojet Airlines (2003–2004), a French Airline
 Eurojet EJ200 a military turbofan, the powerplant of the Eurofighter Typhoon
 Eurojet Romania (2004), Airlines of Romania
 EuroJet Turbo GmbH, which makes the EJ200